Christian Heyd (born 20 December 1878) was a Swiss footballer who played for FC Basel in the 1890s as defender.

Football career
FC Basel was founded on 15 November 1893 and Heyd joined the club about a year later, during their 1894–95 season. He played his first game for the club in the away game on 7 April 1895 as Basel played a 1–1 draw with FC Excelsior Zürich.

Heyd stayed with the team for two seasons, his last game for them was a home game against the same club. On 12 April 1896 Basel won 3–0 against Excelsior Zürich. During his time with the club Heyd played nine games for Basel without scoring a goal.

Notes

Footnotes

References

Sources
 Rotblau: Jahrbuch Saison 2017/2018. Publisher: FC Basel Marketing AG. 
 Die ersten 125 Jahre. Publisher: Josef Zindel im Friedrich Reinhardt Verlag, Basel. 
 Verein "Basler Fussballarchiv" Homepage
(NB: Despite all efforts, the editors of these books and the authors in "Basler Fussballarchiv" have failed to be able to identify all the players, their date and place of birth or date and place of death, who played in the games during the early years of FC Basel)

FC Basel players
Swiss men's footballers
Association football defenders
1878 births
Date of death missing